James Franklin Williams, Jr. (born March 8, 1984) is a former American football cornerback who previously played for the Atlanta Falcons and San Francisco 49ers of the National Football League (NFL). He played college football for Virginia Tech, and was recognized as a unanimous All-American.  He was selected by the Atlanta Falcons in the second round of the 2006 NFL Draft, but was later suspended for violating the NFL's banned substances policy.

Early years
Williams was born in Hampton, Virginia. As a child, he played for the Hampton Tornados in a youth football league. He attended Bethel High School as a senior, playing for the Bethel Bruins high school football team.  He played the previous three seasons playing for Hampton High School, winning a state championship in 1998.  Williams was known for his versatility during his prep career, competing at quarterback, safety, wide receiver and outside linebacker.  He earned All-Peninsula District honors as a junior and senior, adding first-team honors in 2001, and was elected to the Newport News Daily Press All-Star team as a senior.  In his final season, he collected over 100 tackles with two sacks and intercepted seven passes, returning two for touchdowns as a safety and outside linebacker.  On offense, he compiled over 1,000 yards of total offense as a quarterback, passing for five touchdowns and rushing for six.  He also returned punts and kicks.

College career

Williams enrolled at Virginia Polytechnic Institute and State University, where he played for coach Frank Beamer's Virginia Tech Hokies football team as a free safety from 2002 to 2005.  He played sparingly his first year, backing up All-American Willie Pile.

In 2003 season, Williams moved into the starting job, and scored his first career touchdown, taking a 55-yard interception to the endzone against Rutgers.

In the Hokies' 2004 ACC championship season, Williams moved from safety to cornerback and played a critical role in two close games.  In a 17-10 win against Wake Forest, Williams intercepted a Matt Mauk pass in Hokie territory and returned it to midfield to set up a Tech scoring drive.  On Wake's final drive of the game, Williams broke up a pass in the endzone on third down that would have tied the game and potentially sent it into overtime.  Against North Carolina, Williams intercepted a pass from Darian Durant just before halftime that set up a Hokies field goal.

During his senior year at Tech, Williams was a finalist for the Jim Thorpe Award and a unanimous first-team All-American.

Professional career

Atlanta Falcons
Williams was drafted in the second round (37th overall) of the 2006 NFL Draft by the Atlanta Falcons. In his rookie season with the Falcons, Williams started five games and made 24 tackles.

On June 2, 2007, Williams was cited in Richmond, Virginia for possession of marijuana during the 2007 offseason. Due to the NFL's personal conduct policy, he was suspended by Roger Goodell for the first five games of the 2008 season. Williams was released by the Falcons on June 17, 2008. He served the five-game suspension as a free agent and was not signed the rest of the year.

San Francisco 49ers
After spending the 2008 season out of football, Williams was signed to a future contract by the San Francisco 49ers on January 22, 2009.

Williams has been suspended for at least one year for violating the NFL's substance abuse policy,

Spokane Shock
On January 6, 2014, Williams was assigned to the Spokane Shock of the Arena Football League. He was placed on Injured Reserve on March 14, 2014. Williams was released from injured reserve on June 5, 2014.

New Orleans VooDoo
On March 6, 2015, Williams was traded to the New Orleans VooDoo for future considerations.

References

External links
San Francisco 49ers bio 
Virginia Tech Hokies bio 

1984 births
Living people
All-American college football players
American football cornerbacks
American football safeties
Atlanta Falcons players
Hampton High School (Virginia) alumni
Players of American football from Virginia
San Francisco 49ers players
Virginia Tech Hokies football players
Sportspeople from Hampton, Virginia
Spokane Shock players
New Orleans VooDoo players